The 1948 Navy Midshipmen football team represented the United States Naval Academy during the 1948 college football season. In their first season under head coach George Sauer, the Midshipmen compiled a 0–8–1 record and were outscored by their opponents by a combined score of 227 to 77.

Schedule

References

Navy
Navy Midshipmen football seasons
College football winless seasons
Navy Midshipmen football